The Home Counties Premier Cricket League is the top level of competition for recreational club cricket in the Home Counties of England, and has been a designated ECB Premier League since its founding in 2000. It originally served Bedfordshire, Berkshire, Buckinghamshire, Hertfordshire and Oxfordshire, although there are at present no Bedfordshire clubs in the league and all but one of the Hertfordshire clubs withdrew after the 2013 season.

Until 2013 the league consisted of a Division One of ten clubs and a Division Two (East) and a Division Two (West), each of ten clubs, with promotion between Divisions and to and from the feeder leagues. With the withdrawal of the Hertfordshire clubs, the structure was simplified and there is now just Division One and Division Two.

There are two feeder leagues, covering narrower areas within the region:
 Cherwell Cricket League - Primarily Oxfordshire, but also with clubs from Bedfordshire, Buckinghamshire, Hertfordshire, and Northamptonshire.  In the past there have also been clubs from Gloucestershire and Wiltshire.
 Thames Valley Cricket League - A wide area to the west of London. Most clubs have traditionally been from Berkshire and Buckinghamshire, but there are also clubs from Hampshire, Hertfordshire, Middlesex, Oxfordshire, and Surrey.

With the exception of Tring Park who have remained in the Home Counties Premier Cricket League, the Hertfordshire clubs now take part in the Hertfordshire Cricket League.

The Division One teams for 2020 were intended to be: Aston Rowant, Banbury, Buckingham Town, Datchet, Finchampstead, Henley, High Wycombe, Oxford, Thame Town, and Tring Park. The 2020 competition was cancelled because of the COVID-19 pandemic. A replacement competition was organised for the later part of the season when cricket again became possible, but with the winners not to be regarded as official league champions.

Champions

Championships won

Performance by season from 2000

References

External links
 Home Counties Premier Cricket League Official play-cricket website

English domestic cricket competitions
Cricket in Bedfordshire
Cricket in Berkshire
Cricket in Buckinghamshire
Cricket in Oxfordshire
ECB Premier Leagues